The following is a timeline of the history of the city of Perpignan, France.

Before the 17th century

 1172 – Power passes from Counts of Roussillon to the Kingdom of Aragon.
 1276 – Perpignan becomes capital of the Kingdom of Majorca.
 1309 – Palace of the Kings of Majorca built.
 1324 – Cathedral of Saint John the Baptist construction begins.
 1349 – University of Perpignan established by Kings of Aragon.
 1360 – Public clock installed (approximate date).
 1388 - Consulate of the Sea established.
 1475 - French take power.
 1500 - Printing press in use.
 1509 - Perpignan Cathedral completed.
 1542 - Siege of Perpignan (1542) by forces of Francis I of France.

17th–19th centuries
 1601 - Roman Catholic Diocese of Perpignan-Elne established.
 1642 – Siege of Perpignan (1642); French win.
 1659 – City becomes part of France per Treaty of the Pyrenees.
 1790 – Perpignan becomes part of the Pyrénées-Orientales souveraineté.
 1793
 17 July: Battle of Perpignan (1793).
 Population: 9,134.
 1804 – Municipal library active.
 1819 – Journal de Perpignan et des Pyrénées-Orientales newspaper in publication.
 1833 –  (museum) established.
 1840 – Musée d'Histoire naturelle de Perpignan (museum) established.
 1846 – L'Indépendant newspaper begins publication.
 1870 – Le Roussillon newspaper begins publication.
 1872 – Hôtel Pams (house) built.
 1900 –  begins operating.

20th century

 1911
  opens.
 Population: 39,510.
 1921 – Population: 53,742.
 1923 – Aérodrome de la Llabanère begins operating.
 1934 – Canet Roussillon FC (football club) formed.
 1940 – Stade Aimé Giral (stadium) opens.
 1946 – Roussillon Grand Prix motor race begins.
 1952 –  begins operating.
 1962 – Stade Gilbert Brutus (stadium) opens.
 1964 – Perpignan–Rivesaltes Airport terminal rebuilt.
 1968 – Population: 102,191.
 1982 – Association archéologique des Pyrénées-Orientales headquartered in Perpignan.(fr)
 1996 – La Semaine du Roussillon newspaper begins publication.

21st century

 2004 –  (transit entity) active.
 2006 – Population: 114,000.
 2013 – Perpignan–Barcelona high-speed rail line begins operating.
 2014 – March:  held.
 2020 – June: the first time that the Marine Le Pen's party has won a city of more than 100,000 people. Louis Aliot becomes Mayor.

See also
 Perpignan history (fr)
  department
Other cities in the Occitanie region:
 Timeline of Montpellier
 Timeline of Nimes
 Timeline of Toulouse

References

This article incorporates information from the French Wikipedia and Spanish Wikipedia.

Bibliography

 
 
 
 
 
 
  + 1858 ed.

External links

  (bibliography)
 Items related to Perpignan, various dates (via Europeana).
 Items related to Perpignan, various dates (via Digital Public Library of America).

Perpignan
Perpignan